The  Grand Rapids Danger was a team in the North American Basketball League (NABL) in Grand Rapids, Michigan. The Danger played their home games at Grace Christian University.

History

The team formed in 2015 and competed American Basketball Association.  The next year, the team improved to a 12–5 record in the 2016–17 ABA season. The team joined the NABL in 2017 for the 2018 season.

The team is owned by Allen Durham, a native of Grand Rapids who last competed for the Meralco Bolts.

In September 2019, the team suspended its play with a "goal to restructure the organization".

References

External links
Official team website

Basketball teams established in 2015
Basketball teams in Michigan
Sports in Grand Rapids, Michigan
2015 establishments in Michigan
2019 disestablishments in Michigan
Basketball teams disestablished in 2019